Gadhada Taluka is a taluka of Botad District, India. Prior to August 2013 it was part of Bhavnagar District.

Villages
There are seventy-five panchayat villages in Gadhada Taluka.

Notes and references

Talukas of Gujarat
Botad district